Rainer Cadete (born July 24, 1987) is a Brazilian actor. He is known for his roles in various Brazilian telenovelas such as Cama de Gato (2009), Verdades Secretas (2015), Êta Mundo Bom! (2016) among others.

He played the role of Shaolin in the comedy film Cine Holliúdy (2012).

Personal life
In October 2021, Cadete came out as sexually fluid.

Filmography

Television 
Cama de Gato (2009)
Amor à Vida (2013)
Verdades Secretas (2015)
Êta Mundo Bom! (2016)
 A Dona do Pedaço (2019)

Film 
Cine Holliúdy (2012)

References

External links

1987 births
Living people
Male actors from Brasília
Brazilian actors
Brazilian LGBT actors
Brazilian male film actors
Brazilian male telenovela actors
Sexually fluid men